Sadri Gjonbalaj (1966) is an American retired football player who played professionally in the Major Indoor Soccer League, American Soccer League, American Professional Soccer League and National Professional Soccer League. He also earned five caps, scoring one goal, with the U.S. national team.

Early life
Gjonbalaj was born in Vusanje, a village in SR Montenegro, SFR Yugoslavia (modern-day Montenegro). Him and his family moved to Brooklyn, New York when he was a child.

Career

College
Gjonbalaj attended from the age of 17 at North Carolina State University where he played on the Wolfpack's soccer team from 1983 to 1986.

Professional
In June 1987, the Los Angeles Lazers of the Major Indoor Soccer League selected Gjonbalaj in the first round (2nd overall) of the 1987 MISL Draft.  In May 1988, the Lazers loaned Gjonbalaj to the Albany Capitals of the American Soccer League.  In 1989, he was with the New Jersey Eagles of the ASL.  Then in 1990, he moved to the Washington Diplomats of the ASL successor league, the American Professional Soccer League.  In the fall of 1990, he signed with the New York Kick of the National Professional Soccer League (NPSL).  In January 1991, the Kick sold Gjonbalaj's contract to the Chicago Power.  He played nine games and scored two goals as the Power won the NPSL championship.  In December 1991, he signed with the Milwaukee Wave.  In 1993, he played for the Raleigh Flyers of the USISL.  He then moved to the New York Fever for the 1994 season.  In December 1994, he returned to the NPSL when he signed with the Canton Invaders.  In 1995, he was with the New York Centaurs of the A-League where he scored four goals in twenty games.

National team
In 1984 and 1985, Gjonbalaj played for the United States U-20 men's national soccer team. Gjonbalaj also earned five caps with the U.S. national team.  His first appearance came in a February 5, 1986 scoreless tie with Canada when he came on for Brent Goulet.  His next cap did not come until a June 12, 1987 loss to South Korea.  He had to wait three more years for his third cap which came in a September 14, 1991 win over Jamaica.  Gjonbalaj scored the U.S. goal in the 1-0 victory.  It was another two years before Gjonbalaj appeared for the U.S. again, this time on March 23, 1993 in a tie with El Salvador.  His last cap came two days later on March 25, 1993.

References

External links
 MISL stats

1966 births
Living people
People from Plav Municipality
Sportspeople from Brooklyn
Soccer players from New York City
Yugoslav emigrants to the United States
Albanians in Montenegro
American people of Albanian descent
Association football forwards
Montenegrin footballers
American soccer players
United States men's under-20 international soccer players
United States men's international soccer players
NC State Wolfpack men's soccer players
Los Angeles Lazers players
Albany Capitals players
New Jersey Eagles players
Washington Diplomats (1988–1990) players
New York Kick players
Chicago Power players
Milwaukee Wave players
Raleigh Flyers players
Canton Invaders players
New York Centaurs players
American Soccer League (1988–89) players
American Professional Soccer League players
Major Indoor Soccer League (1978–1992) players
National Professional Soccer League (1984–2001) players
USISL players
Montenegrin expatriate footballers